Rafael Bobadilla (born 24 October 1963) is a retired Paraguayan football midfielder.

References

1963 births
Living people
Paraguayan footballers
Club Olimpia footballers
Millonarios F.C. players
Unión de Santa Fe footballers
San Lorenzo de Almagro footballers
Cerro Porteño players
Club Guaraní players
Leones Negros UdeG footballers
The Strongest players
Resistencia S.C. footballers
Association football midfielders
Paraguay international footballers
Paraguayan expatriate footballers
Expatriate footballers in Colombia
Paraguayan expatriate sportspeople in Colombia
Expatriate footballers in Argentina
Paraguayan expatriate sportspeople in Argentina
Expatriate footballers in Mexico
Paraguayan expatriate sportspeople in Mexico
Expatriate footballers in Bolivia
Paraguayan expatriate sportspeople in Bolivia